Miracle Laurie (born August 1, 1981) is an American actress, best known for portraying Mellie on the Joss Whedon drama Dollhouse.

Career
Laurie started towards a professional acting career at Orange Coast College, where she was part of the student-run repertory theatre. She also appeared in several faculty-directed shows at the school. Notable roles from this period include Belle Starr and other female roles in Jessie and the Bandit Queen in 2000 and Ariel in William Shakespeare's The Tempest in 2001.

Laurie's first credited TV role was sorority sister Veronica in "Team", a 2004 episode of Medical Investigation. In 2009, she played Elsa in the pilot episode of The Cabonauts.

That same year, Joss Whedon cast Laurie in his show Dollhouse, which depicted a secret corporation that recruits troubled young people, stores their memories in a computer, wipes their minds (turning them into "dolls"), imprints them with new personalities, and rents them to wealthy people for special assignments. Her first major dramatic role, Laurie played a supporting character named Mellie. She also dances and plays the ukulele in Uke Box Heroes, a ukulele cover band that she co-formed with her husband.

Laurie and her mother, Cathy Anne, appeared as members of the audience in the October 6, 2010 episode of The Late Late Show with Craig Ferguson, and participated in Ferguson's opening monologue during the cold open.

Filmography

Film

Television

References

External links

Uke Box Heroes official site

1981 births
21st-century American actresses
Living people
Actresses from California
American television actresses
American female dancers
American dancers
People from Greater Los Angeles
American ukulele players
American musicians of Filipino descent